Ugo Njoku (born 27 November 1994, in Nigeria) is a Nigerian  footballer plays defender for Croix Savoie Ambilly in the Nigerian Women's Championship and the Nigeria women's national football team.

International career

Ugo Njoku played at Rivers Angels in the Nigerian Women's Championship from 2013 to 2017, after that she moved on to Croix Savoie Ambilly.

Njoku had her first international action in 2014 while playing for Nigeria in the 2014 FIFA U-20 Women's World Cup match against Namibia. She was also part of the winning squad at the 2014 African Women's Championship.
In May 2015 Njoku was called up to play for team Nigeria in the 2015 FIFA Women's World Cup.

During the 2015 FIFA Women's World Cup Group Match vs Australia Njoku elbowed Australian player Sam Kerr in the face. Njoku's actions, which were described as one of the most violent acts seen in a women's football match could result in a lengthy bag for the Nigerian player. Njoku was eventually suspended for three competitive games by the disciplinary panel, in effect ruling her out for the remainder of the tournament.

Honours

International
 Nigeria
 African Women's Championship (2): 2014, 2016

References

External links
 
 

1994 births
Living people
Rivers Angels F.C. players
2015 FIFA Women's World Cup players
Women's association football midfielders
Nigerian women's footballers
Nigeria women's international footballers